Daio may refer to:
Daio Wasabi Farm, Azumino, Nagano Prefecture, Japan
Daio Paper, Japan's third largest paper company

People
Daniel Daio, former Prime Minister of São Tomé and Príncipe
Daio Powell, Welsh rugby player

See also
Dayo (disambiguation)